Charles Cook may refer to:

Sportsmen
Charles Cook (footballer, born 1898) (1898–?), Scottish footballer
Charles Cook (footballer, born 1972), Welsh footballer and manager
Charlie Cook (wrestler), retired American professional wrestler
Charlie Cook (ice hockey) (born 1982), American ice hockey defenseman

Others
Charles Cook (New York politician) (1800–1866), New York businessman and politician
Charles Cook (dancer) (1914–1991), tap dancer
Charles A. Cook (died 1878), mayor of Denver, Colorado, 1861–1863
Charles D. Cook (1935–2001), New York politician 
Chuck Cook (Charles Henry Cook, 1926–1993), Canadian radio talk show host and member of Parliament
Charles Cook (academic) (1843–1910), New Zealand mathematician
Charlie Cook (born 1953), American pollster founded the political newsletter Cook Political Report

See also
Charles Cooke (disambiguation)
Charlie Cooke (born 1942), Scottish footballer